Viforeni may refer to several villages in Romania:

 Viforeni is a village in Ungureni Commune, Bacău County
 Viforeni, a village in Gorbănești Commune, Botoșani County